Vinson Wall (born October 17, 1947) is an American politician. He served as a Republican member for the 61st and 82nd district of the Georgia House of Representatives.

Life and career 
Wall was born in Clarke County, Georgia and attended Gwinnett High School. He was a Air National Guard for six years.

In 1973, Wall was elected to represent the 61st district of the Georgia House of Representatives. In 1982, he left office to run for the Georgia State Senate but was unsuccessful. Two years later he was re-elected to the 61st district seat, succeeding Rex Millsap who had gained the seat after Wall left.

In response to an attorney general ruling that coroners cannot subpoena police or medical records triggered by the controversial investigation into the beating death of a teenager, Wall proposed a bill in 1986 to grant inquest powers to medical examiners and coroners along with bills related to the office of coroner.

In the 1990s, Wall was elected to represent the 82nd district. He served until 1996, when he was succeeded by Mike Coan.

References 

1947 births
Living people
People from Clarke County, Georgia
Republican Party members of the Georgia House of Representatives
20th-century American politicians